Henri Joseph Van Dyck (25 March 1849, Bruges - 9 February 1934, Antwerp) was a Belgian painter.

Biography
Around 1869, he was enrolled at the art school in Roubaix, where he studied with Alphonse Colas. Later, he was at the Royal Academy of Fine Arts in Antwerp, where his instructors included Jozef Van Lerius. His works consist largely of portraits and genre scenes, rendered in great realistic detail.

Max was married to  Éliane de Meuse, the first woman to win the Prix Godecharle (1921).

His works may be seen at the Royal Museum of Fine Arts Antwerp.

Sources
 Wim Pas, Greet Pas (Eds.), Dictionnaire biographique. Arts plastiques en Belgique. Peintres, sculptures, graveurs, 1800-2002, De Gulden Roos, Anvers, 2002 
 Allgemeines Künstlerlexikon, Vol.31, De Gruyter, Berlin, 2002

External links

1849 births
1934 deaths
Belgian portrait painters
Belgian genre painters
Artists from Bruges